Babayevo is a town and the administrative center of Babayevsky District in Vologda Oblast, Russia, located in the south of the district, on the Kolp River (Volga's basin)  west of Vologda, the administrative center of the oblast. Population:

History
It was first mentioned as a village in 1545. In 1882, a metallurgical plant, which produced telegraph wires, nails, and hooks, was built here. The railway station opened in 1901, boosting development. Before 1918, Babayevo was a part of Ustyuzhensky Uyezd of Novgorod Governorate. In June 1918, five uyezds of Novgorod Governorate, including Ustyuzhensky Uyezd, were split off to form Cherepovets Governorate, with the administrative center in Cherepovets. In 1925, Babayevo was granted town status. On August 1, 1927, Cherepovets Governorate was abolished and its territory became Cherepovets Okrug of Leningrad Oblast. At the same time, uyezds were abolished and Babayevsky District was established. Babayevo became the administrative center of the district. On September 23, 1937, Babayevsky District was transferred to newly established Vologda Oblast.

Geography

Climate

Administrative and municipal status
Within the framework of administrative divisions, Babayevo serves as the administrative center of Babayevsky District. As an administrative division, it is incorporated within Babayevsky District as the town of district significance of Babayevo.

As a municipal division, the town of district significance of Babayevo, together with four rural localities in Volodinsky Selsoviet of Babayevsky District, is incorporated within Babayevsky Municipal District as Babayevo Urban Settlement.

Economy

Industry
There are two dairy plants, an electrical engineering plant, and a furniture factory in the town.

Transportation

In Babayevo, there is a station on the railway connecting Vologda to St. Petersburg via Cherepovets.

Babayevo has an all-season road connection south to Ustyuzhna and north to Borisovo-Sudskoye. There are no all-season through roads to Vytegorsky District, Belozersky District, or to Leningrad Oblast. There is bus traffic originating from Babayevo.

Culture and recreation
The town is home to the Babayevsky District Museum, which opened in 1978 mostly due to the efforts of Mariya Gorbunova, a local teacher and later the head of the local education department. She became the first director of the museum. The museum currently is named after her.

References

Notes

Sources

External links
Official website of Babayevo 
Directory of organizations in Babayevo 

Cities and towns in Vologda Oblast
1460 establishments in Europe
15th-century establishments in Russia
Babayevsky District